Michiel Servaes (born 21 February 1972) is a Dutch politician. As a member of the Labour Party (Partij van de Arbeid) he was an MP between 20 September 2012 and 23 March 2017.

In 2015, news media reported that Servaes was included in a Russian blacklist of prominent people from the European Union who are not allowed to enter the country.

References

External links 
 
  Michiel Servaes at the website of the Labour Party

1972 births
21st-century Dutch politicians
Labour Party (Netherlands) politicians
Living people
Members of the House of Representatives (Netherlands)
People from Oss